Ronald Francis Gora (July 10, 1933 – March 11, 2014) was an American competition swimmer and Pan American Games champion. Gora was born in Chicago, Illinois and attended Lane Tech High School in Chicago. He remains tied with Tom Jager and Brian Alden for the second most individual high school state championships won by a male in Illinois.

Gora won a gold medal in the 4×200-meter freestyle relay event at the 1951 Pan American Games in Buenos Aires, Argentina, alongside Dick Cleveland, Burwell Jones and Bill Heusner.  Individually, he also received a Pan American Games silver medal for his second-place finish in the 100-meter freestyle.  Gora again represented the United States at the 1952 Summer Olympics in Helsinki, Finland, where he finished eighth in the final of the men's 100-meter freestyle with a time of 58.8 seconds. He attended the University of Michigan, and swam for the Michigan Wolverines swimming and diving team in National Collegiate Athletic Association (NCAA) competition from 1952 to 1954.  He was a member of Michigan's NCAA national championship teams in the 400-yard freestyle relay in 1953 and 1954.

Gora had four sisters. On November 16, 1963, he married Maria Käppeler, they had one daughter and two sons. Gora had 2 daughters and 2 son's from a previous marriage.

See also
List of University of Michigan alumni

References

1933 births
2014 deaths
American male freestyle swimmers
Michigan Wolverines men's swimmers
Olympic swimmers of the United States
Swimmers from Chicago
Swimmers at the 1951 Pan American Games
Swimmers at the 1952 Summer Olympics
Pan American Games gold medalists for the United States
Pan American Games silver medalists for the United States
Pan American Games medalists in swimming
Medalists at the 1951 Pan American Games
20th-century American people
21st-century American people